Kadaladi is a state assembly constituency in Ramanathapuram district in Tamil Nadu. It is a component of Ramanathapuram Lok sabha constituency. It is one of the 234 State Legislative Assembly Constituencies in Tamil Nadu, in India.

Members of Legislative Assembly

Election Results

2006

2001

1996

1991

1989

1984

1980

1977

1971

1967

References

External links
 

Former assembly constituencies of Tamil Nadu
Ramanathapuram district